Iglesia de Santa María (Monasterio de Hermo) is a church in Asturias, Spain.

References

Churches in Asturias